Mpika Central is a constituency of the National Assembly of Zambia. It covers the towns of Chikwanda, Chilonga, Kabuko, Kaole, Mpika and Mwelalo in Mpika District of Muchinga Province.

List of MPs

References

Constituencies of the National Assembly of Zambia
1964 establishments in Zambia
Constituencies established in 1964